Paradise Orchestra was an Italo House band formed in 1989 in Rome, by Corrado Rizza, Domenico Scuteri and Igino Bianchi. 

Paradise Orchestra are mainly remembered for two Club Hit singles "Satisfy Your Dream", feat. Melvin Hudson, and "Colour Me", feat. Karen Jones.

"Satisfy Your Dream" was included in several remixes and compilations, including The House Sound Of Europe - Vol V with the UK label FFRR Records. 

"Colour Me", released in 1991, was produced by Corrado Rizza, Gino Woody Bianchi and Dom Scuteri.

References

External links
 Paradise Orchestra at Discogs
 Paradise Orchestra - Color Me at Discogs

Italian Italo disco musicians
Italian dance music groups